Maxwell Richard Bennett (born February 19, 1939) is an Australian neuroscientist specializing in the function of synapses.

Life 
Max Bennett was a student at Christian Brothers College, St Kilda and did his undergraduate work in electrical engineering and physics at University of Melbourne in 1959, where he founded the Athenian Society dedicated to understanding Plato, Aristotle and Wittgenstein. His interest in brain and mind led to postgraduate research in biology on synapses (1963 – 1966). In 1968 he took up a position as lecturer in physiology at Sydney University, where he was later awarded in 1980 the first and largest Centre of Research Excellence of the 10 established by the Australian Government over all disciplines within Australian universities. He was then appointed Personal Chair, the second in the university's history, subsequently being made Professor of Neuroscience. In 2000 he was elected to the first University Chair ('for research recognized internationally as of exceptional distinction'), and in 2003 he was made Founding Director of the Brain and Mind Research Institute at Sydney, a position he still holds in 2014 at 75.

Neuroscience 
Following his graduation in electrical engineering in 1963, and the beginning of his postgraduate research in biology, Bennett discovered that the accepted paradigm of nearly 50 years, that there are only two transmitters, noradrenaline and acetylcholine, was incorrect there being at least two other transmitters. These non-adrenergic and non-cholinergic (NANC) transmitters act on smooth muscle cells, they generate action potentials due to the influx of calcium ions, the first to be identified. In the succeeding years Bennett and his colleagues elucidated how NANC transmission, involving purines, neuropeptides and nitric oxide, is affected. In 1972 he discovered that lesioned nerve terminals are precisely reconstituted at the same site on a striated muscle cell, indicating the existence of synapse formation molecules on muscle cells. In 2001 Bennett and colleagues showed that once a nerve terminal is established the glial ensheathing cells can guide the formation of new synapses on mature muscle cells in a matter of minutes. In 2007 he observed that  microglial cells of the brain can conduct calcium waves that are mediated by the release of NANC transmitters (purines), opening up the study of the interaction of the immune and nervous systems at the level of the synapse.

History and philosophy of neuroscience 
The main theme of Bennett's philosophical work is that brain scientists have misused language in attributing our psychological capacities as in thinking, remembering, perceiving etc. to the brain. Rather it is the person whose brain it is that possesses these attributes, the brain being necessary for us to express these abilities. This mistake is referred to as the "mereological fallacy" by Bennett and his colleague Peter Hacker. Clarifying these misunderstandings has profound implications for how we view ourselves. In his historical work Bennett has followed the evolution of our ideas concerning the functioning of the different components of the brain and their organization from the time of Aristotle to the present. He argues that fundamental ideas arise in this area through a combination of research, prejudice and irrationality and of how appropriate hypotheses concerning brain function are often abandoned for extended periods of time in favour of less logical hypotheses. Such an hypothesis is one in which it is posited that brain function can be considered in isolation from the behaviour of the human whose brain it is, whereas behaviour (broadly conceived) is the bedrock upon which all studies of human attributes rests, neuroscientific or otherwise. Bennett's most recent books concerning these issues include The Idea of Consciousness (1997), History of the Synapse (2000), Philosophical Foundations of Neuroscience (2003; with Peter Hacker) and Neuroscience and Philosophy: Brain, Mind and Language (with Daniel Dennett, John Searle and Peter Hacker; 2006). More recently he elaborated on the theme that much of neuroscience repeatedly makes the mistake of not only attributing to the brain psychological capacities that can only be attributed to the person whose brain it is, but also attributing these capacities to parts of the brain, a "modular fallacy". Furthermore, Bennett argues that cognitive neuroscience "represents" these capacities as interconnected boxes leading to reification of the person with these capacities. These difficulties are spelt out in his books Virginia Woolf and Neuropsychiatry (2013) as well as in History of Cognitive Neuroscience (2008; with Peter Hacker).

Neuropsychiatry 
In 2009 Bennett and his colleagues turned to consideration of the functioning of synapses in neuropsychiatric diseases and established for the first time how stress leads to the loss of synapses in certain parts of the brain, which in turn is responsible for the loss of grey matter observed in patients using Magnetic Resonance Imaging. His preliminary calculations then provided the first quantitative account of how synaptic activity in the brain, driving impulse activity, is responsible for utilizing most of the cortical energy. This was followed by a quantitative account of how the loss of nerve pathway integrity in the brain in schizophrenia leads to dysfunction of synapses in the grey matter and hence a decrease in cortical energy.

Organizations founded 
In 1985 the Australian Academy of Science asked Max Bennett FAA to respond to the criticisms of the then Minister for Science (Mr Barry Jones AC) that scientists and technologists did not engage the general public in the importance of research and its relevance to society. Bennett then chaired a meeting of all 82 representative societies in the academy (Canberra) in order to form the main lobby for this group, which he named the Federation of Australian Scientific and Technological Societies (FASTS; now Science and Technology, Australia).

In 1994 Bennett represented Australia at a planning meeting for the World Congress of Neuroscience in Kyoto, during which the paucity of representation of the Autonomic Neurosciences was raised. Subsequently, at a meeting of senior Neuroscientists in Melbourne in 1994, chaired by Bennett, this representation was forthcoming with the formation of what he called the International Society for Autonomic Neuroscience (ISAN), responsible for eight biannual international congresses since that time.

In 2000 the World Health Organization (WHO) predicted that disorders of the brain and mind, such as depression, would become the major disabilities facing the world by 2020. In order to help meet that challenge Bennett initiated in Sydney in 2003 a multidisciplinary research institute in neuroscience, neurology and psychiatry, with outpatients and the support of 18 research professors working in 15,000 square meters of new research space and clinical services. He called this the Brain and Mind Research Institute (BMRI) and was made Founding Director by the University of Sydney.

In 2002 the most urgent need in Australia for support of those with disabilities of the brain and mind, noted by WHO, was identified in Northern Australia. In order to contribute to the amelioration of these Bennett initiated the formation of the Tropical Brain and Mind Research Foundation (TBMRF), initially chaired by the present Governor General of Australia, Sir Peter Cosgrove.

Awards and lectures 
Officer of the Order of Australia, appointed in The Queen's Birthday 2001 Honours List, 'for his service to the biological sciences, particularly in the field of neuroscience and as a major contributor to the establishment of organisations aimed at furthering interdisciplinary research in this field, and to education'. In addition, Bennett has received the following recognition: Goddard Research Award, Australian National Heart Foundation, 1996; Ramaciotti Medal, Clive and Vera Ramaciotti Foundation, 1996; Renensson Research Award, Australian National Heart Foundation, 1998; Macfarlane Burnet Medal and Lecture, Australian Academy of Science, 1999; Malcolm Research Award, Australian National Heart Foundation, 1999;  Distinguished Achievement Medal, Australian Neuroscience Society, 2001;  Excellence in Science (Tall Poppy) Award, Australian Institute of Political Science, 2001; Almgren Research Award, Australian National Heart Foundation, 2001; Academia Ophthalmologica Internationalis Award, 2002; Centenary Medal, 2003; Honorary Fellow, Australian Neuroscience Society, 2010.

In 1996 Bennett gave the Opening Plenary Lecture at the World Congress of Neuroscience (Tokyo). This was succeeded by distinguished lectures in neuroscience, neuropsychiatry as well as in the history and philosophy of neuroscience as follows:  Plenary Lecture, International Conference, Research Society on Alcoholism, 2001;  Featured Speaker, XIV World Congress of Cardiology, 2002; Academia Ophthalmologica Internationalis Oration, 2002;  Plenary Lecture, American Philosophical Association, 2005; Plenary Lecture, International Congress of Neuropsychiatry, 2006; Plenary Lecture, The Royal Australian & New Zealand College of Psychiatrists, 2007; Plenary Lecture, World Congress in Medical Informatics, 2008; Plenary Lecture, International Congress in Nanotechnology, 2008; Plenary Lecture, World Congress of Mental Health Nurses, 2009; Grass Lecture, Indian National Institute of Mental Health & Neuroscience, 2009; Nour Foundation Lecture (at the United Nations, NY), 2009; Franke Lectures, (Yale University), 2013

Selected works

Articles 
 Bennett MR, Hacker PM. The motor system in neuroscience: a history and analysis of conceptual developments. Prog Neurobiol. 2002 May;67(1):1-52.
 Bennett MR, Hacker PM. Perception and memory in neuroscience: a conceptual analysis. Prog Neurobiol. 2001 Dec;65(6):499-543.
 Bennett MR. Criminal law as it pertains to 'mentally incompetent defendants': a McNaughton rule in the light of cognitive neuroscience. Australian and New Zealand Journal of Psychiatry 2009; 43(4):289-99.
 Bennett MR. The discovery of a new class of synaptic transmitters in smooth muscle 50 years ago and amelioration of coronary artery thrombosis. Acta Physiol (Oxf). 2013 Feb;207(2):236-43
 Bennett MR, Pettigrew AG. The formation of neuromuscular synapses. Cold Spring Harb Symp Quant Biol. 1976;40:409-24.
 Bennett MR. Schizophrenia: susceptibility genes, dendritic-spine pathology and gray matter loss. Prog Neurobiol. 2011 Nov;95(3):275-300.

Books 
Bennett's books have been translated into several languages.
 Autonomic Neuromuscular Transmission (1972) Publisher: Cambridge University Press; 
 Optimising Research and Development in Australia (1987) Publisher: Australian Academy of Science; 
 The Idea of Consciousness: Synapses and the Mind (1997) Publisher: Harwood Academic; 
 History of the Synapse (2001) Publisher: Harwood Academic; 
 Philosophical Foundations of Neuroscience (2003) Publisher: Blackwell; (with Peter Hacker)
 Neuroscience and Philosophy : Brain, Mind and Language (2006) Publisher: Columbia University Press (with Daniel Dennett, John Searle and Peter Hacker)
 History of Cognitive Neuroscience (2008) Publisher: Wiley/Blackwell;  (with Peter Hacker)
 Virginia Woolf and Neuropsychiatry (2013)  Publisher: Springer;

Interviews

References

External links 
 Melbourne University Undergraduate: the Athenian Society (http://our-history.unimelb.edu.au/biographies/ken-mcnaughton/)
 University of Sydney Profile: (http://sydney.edu.au/medicine/people/academics/profiles/maxb.php)
 Neurobiology Profile: (http://www.physiol.usyd.edu.au/research/labs/nrc/members/bennett.html)
 Australian Academy of Science Profile: (http://www.science.org.au/scientists/interviews/b/bennett.html)
 Career Interview, Australian Academy of Science: (http://www.science.org.au/scientists/interviews/b/notes_bennett.html)
 Superstars of Science Ratings: (http://superstarsofscience.com/scientist/max-bennett)
 United Nations Lecture on ‘The Impact of Brain Function on the Concept of Criminality’ (YouTube: https://www.youtube.com/watch?v=aeKTxlp5W6U)
 Yale Franke Lecture I: The History of the Mind (YouTube: https://www.youtube.com/watch?v=JPt5Ot1UdDs)
 Yale Franke Lecture II: The History of Consciousness (YouTube: https://www.youtube.com/watch?v=BUadXXaEuPk)
 Who's Who of Australia list of awards.

Living people
Australian neuroscientists
1939 births
University of Melbourne alumni
Academic staff of the University of Sydney
People educated at St Mary's College, Melbourne
20th-century Australian scientists
21st-century Australian scientists